Byron White is an Australian sailor.

Together with teammate William Ryan White became second at the 2008 World Championships in the 29er boat by finishing behind fellow Australians Steven Thomas and Jasper Warren, but in front of Britons Max Richardson and Alex Groves who took the bronze.

Career highlights
World Championships
2008 - Sorrento,  2nd, 29er (with William Ryan)

External links 
 
 29er World Championships
 Gold And Silver To Australia At 29er Worlds

Living people
Australian male sailors (sport)
29er class sailors
Year of birth missing (living people)